Löbau-Zittau is a former Kreis (district) in the east of Saxony, Germany. Neighboring districts were the district Bautzen in the north-west and the Niederschlesischer Oberlausitzkreis in the north. To the east was Poland, and to the south the Czech Republic.

History 
The district was formed in 1994 by merging two previous districts, Löbau and Zittau. In August 2008, it became a part of the new district of Görlitz.

Geography 
The main river in the district is the Lusatian Neisse, which also forms the boundary to Poland. It is mostly hilly landscape of the Lausitzer Bergland; the highest elevation is the Lausche with 793 m above sea level.

Coat of arms

Towns and municipalities

External links
Official website (German)

Görlitz (district)